SIBA AB (sometimes Siba or siba without capitalisation) was a large Swedish chain of home electronics retail stores. Siba was headquartered in Gothenburg. In 2009, there were 60 stores in Sweden, Denmark and Norway.

History 
SIBA was a success story that had its beginnings in 1951 at Herkulesgatan 7 on Hisingen. Net on Net Group (Siba's partner company) announced they would integrate Siba into Netonnet. Siba's official website now leads directly to NetOnNet's web shop, and all stores were either made into NetonNet stores or closed down.

1950s 
The year was 1951 – a time when there was only one radio station that mainly offered radio readings. Music on the radio was unusual. Then started SIBA by Folke Bengtsson. Besides radios and radiogrammofoner, sold chandeliers from own production.

1960s 
Folke Bengtsson's son Bengt Bengtsson took over the business in 1961 and developed SIBA into a pure radio and television chain. SIBA grew with new stores in Gothenburg.

1970s 
1974 SIBA opened Sweden's first department store for radio and TV in Backaplan in Gothenburg. The slogan "Lower rates – better service" was coined. People from Sweden and Norway flocked to Backaplan to buy consumer electronics.

1980s 
During the mid to late 80's expanded SIBA, and new stores opened in the western and southern Sweden. As one of the first consumer electronics chains took, SIBA in 1989 up computers and telephony in its range.

1990s 
SIBA third business, Kitchen and Laundry, was introduced in 1994. In autumn 1997, the chain was acquired by Tandy's Computer City, with stores in Sweden and Denmark. SIBA is now the largest reseller of data and voice services to the consumer market.

In the late 1990s, was SIBA the biggest expansion ever. New stores opened across the country, including a number of stores in the Stockholm area. The goal was clear: to become the leading player in consumer electronics in the Nordic region.

2000s 
In the 2000s, SIBA continued its expansion in Sweden and Denmark. Additionally, opened SIBA first store in Norway. Oslo's residents queued for several weeks to pick up a bargain home in the Group's first store, located in Furuseth.

2010s 
SIBA has now consolidated its position as one of the leading Nordic chains for consumer electronics. SIBA in 2011 celebrated its 60th anniversary.

2014 
Fabian Bengtsson  ends his CEO career with the company and will now continue on the board of directors and take over the presidency from his father. He will continue to play the main role in the company's television commercials. The new CEO, Susanne Ehnbåge, began her career at Siba as a business developer, and has since advanced to business developer, marketing manager and vice president.

2017 
Siba's parent company Net On Net Group announced already in 2016 that the Siba chain would be integrated into NetOnNet. In 2017, all suitable stores had been converted and any remaining Siba stores had closed by the summer.

References

External links 
 Siba – official website
NetOnNet – official website

Companies based in Gothenburg
Retail companies of Sweden
Retail companies established in 1951
Retail companies disestablished in 2017
Swedish companies disestablished in 2017
Swedish companies established in 1951